The Lips is a 2010 Argentine drama film directed by Iván Fund and Santiago Loza. It was entered into the Un Certain Regard section of the 2010 Cannes Film Festival.

The film opened theatrically in the United States at Maysles Cinema in June, 2011 as part of the Documentary in Bloom series.

Cast
 Eva Bianco
 Raul Lagge
 Victoria Raposo
 Adela Sanchez

Plot
The film follows a three women who deeply inhabit their cinematic roles as social workers interacting with members of an impoverished rural Argentine neighborhood. Facing poverty, the three move into makeshift living quarters in a run down hospital. They then begin the work of recording data on the needs of the community and getting to know each other, while trying to make their living quarters habitable, and still find time for an occasional night out.

Awards
 2010 Cannes Film Festival: Un Certain Regard Award for Best Actress (Adela Sanchez, Eva Bianco, and Victoria Raposo)

References

External links
 
 New York Times Critic Pick! review

2010 films
Argentine drama films
Spanish drama films
2010 drama films
2010s Argentine films